A breakout is when prices pass through and stay through an area of support or resistance. On the technical analysis chart a break out occurs when price of a stock or commodity exits an area pattern. Oftentimes, a stock or commodity will bounce between the areas of support and resistance and when it breaks through either one of these barriers you can consider the direction that it's heading in a trend. Often the resistance level the price breaks through becomes a new support level, and vice versa. This can be a "Buy" or "Sell" signal depending on which barrier it broke through.

References

Breakout with volume

Technical analysis